Nightmare at Crack Axle Canyon (formerly known as Starchaser and Nightmare at Phantom Cave) was a twister roller coaster at Great Escape amusement park in Queensbury, New York. The relatively simple steel coaster was enclosed in a warehouse-like building allowing the cars to run in the dark giving a heightened sense of disorientation around sharp twists and turns. The ride was situated in the park's Ghosttown area and was appropriately-themed to the Old West.

History
Before arriving at The Great Escape, Nightmare at Crack Axle Canyon was located at Beech Bend Park, Kentucky Kingdom as Starchaser and at Darien Lake as Nightmare at Phantom Cave. The 2006 season was the last season that the roller coaster was open at The Great Escape. The park later confirmed that the coaster had been scrapped, possibly shortly after its closure. In 2013, at The Great Escape during Fright Fest (Halloween event) the building is used for a haunted house.

Capacity issues
The trains were single cars with two rows of two riders each, for a total capacity of four riders per car. The low capacity could result in long wait times. To remedy this, the new Flash Pass system (named for the Flash, a licensed DC Comics character) was introduced in 2006. Riders arriving at the attraction were given a ticket and asked to return at a designated time, when lines were noticeably shorter.

References
Nightmare at Crack Axel Canyon listing at RCDB.com

Roller coasters operated by Six Flags
Former roller coasters in New York (state)
The Great Escape and Hurricane Harbor